The women's 100 metres butterfly at the 2018 World Para Swimming European Championships was held at the National Aquatic Centre in Dublin from 13 to 19 August.  5 classification finals were held in all over this event.

Medalists

See also
List of IPC world records in swimming

References

100 metres butterfly